Martin Steven Fridson (born September 4, 1952, in Highland Park, Michigan) is an American author known for his application of rigorous financial theory to the field of high yield bonds. He is also a philanthropist and an author in the subjects of financial reporting, financial history, and political economy. Fridson has been referred to as the "dean of high yield debt." He is currently chief investment officer of Lehmann, Livian, Fridson Advisors LLC, an investment firm based in New York, and publisher of Income Securities Investor newsletter. He lives on Manhattan's Upper West Side with his wife, Elaine Sisman.

Education
Fridson earned a B.A. cum laude in history from Harvard University in 1974, and as a result of gaining entrepreneurial work experience with Southwestern Advantage selling books door-to-door during college, was able to attend Harvard Business School the following semester, eventually graduating in 1976 with an MBA. He was also awarded the Chartered Financial Analyst designation in 1982.

Career
Fridson interviewed with Mitchell Hutchins and accepted a position as an electric utility bond trader in 1976. After Mitchell Hutchins was acquired by Paine Webber in 1977 he left with his trading group to Scandinavian Securities, where he worked ultimately as an assistant vice president. In 1980 he went to Paine Webber's Jackon Curtis arm as a vice president in credit research and fixed income investment strategy. In 1981 he joined Salomon Brothers as a vice president focusing primarily in credit research continuing to take a high interest in the high yield debt world. At this time, high yield debt came into the sights of institutional investors as a portfolio enhancing investment and there was a great demand for quality research in the field. According to Fridson, much of the high yield analysis at the time was indistinguishable from advocacy. Realizing the opportunity for this kind of research he left for Morgan Stanley in 1984, where he began to challenge market lore and accepted practices by using statistical and econometric techniques, leading to many active trading strategies. Here he became a principal before leaving for Merrill Lynch in 1989, where he was director of high yield strategy until 2002. His contributions to the field of high yield debt at Merrill came from applying econometric techniques to active portfolio management strategies. While at Merrill he also documented a definitive history of the high yield debt market, which as Fridson says, "was shrouded in myth." In 2002, he left Merrill to found his own firm, FridsonVision LLC. In May 2008, Fridson sold Leverage World and Distressed Debt Investor, the two primary research products of FridsonVision, and became the CEO of Fridson Investment Advisors, an investment management company focusing on corporate credit opportunities.   Following that firm's acquisition by BNP Paribas, he served as global credit strategist in the bank's asset management subsidiary.  In August 2012 he resumed operations under the FridsonVision LLC banner.

Fridson has also been a consultant to the Federal Reserve Board of Governors since the Clinton Administration.

He has been a guest lecturer at the graduate business schools of Babson College, Columbia University, Dartmouth College, Duke University, Fordham University, Georgetown University, Harvard University, the Massachusetts Institute of Technology, New York University, University of Notre Dame, Rutgers University and the Wharton School of Business, as well as the Amsterdam Institute of Finance. He has served as president of the Fixed Income Analysts Society, governor of the Association for Investment Management and Research (now the CFA Institute), and director of the New York Society of Security Analysts. Currently, Fridson serves on the editorial boards of Financial Analysts Journal, CFA Digest, and Journal of Investment Management.

Awards and recognition
In 2000, he became the youngest person ever inducted into the Fixed Income Analysts Society Hall of Fame.
In 2002, the Financial Management Association International named Fridson the Financial Executive of the Year.
 For nine consecutive years through 2002, participants in the Institutional Investor All-America research survey ranked Fridson number-one in his category. The magazine's editors dubbed him "the dean of the high yield bond market."

Critique
"Perhaps the most well-known figure in the high yield world," according to Investment Dealers' Digest.
"One of Wall Street's most thoughtful and perceptive analysts," according to The New York Times.
"No one brings more insight or a better reputation for integrity to the junk-bond market than Marty Fridson," according to Barron's.
 "A hybrid of Stephen Hawking and Studs Terkel" according to investment manager Michael McAdams.
Pensions & Investments called his satirical writing on financial markets "worthy of Jonathan Swift."

Works
High Yield Bonds, 1989
Financial Statement Analysis, 1991
Investment Illusions, 1996
It Was a Very Good Year, 2000
How to be a Billionaire, 2001
Unwarranted Intrusions, 2006
"Think like a Billionaire", 2003

References

External links and sources
Martin Fridson's personal website
Fridson on CNBC's Street Smarts
Fridson on Forbes TV Network

1952 births
Living people
American economics writers
American male non-fiction writers
American finance and investment writers
Harvard Business School alumni
People from Highland Park, Michigan
CFA charterholders